Quique may refer to:
 Quique (given name)
 Quique (album), 1993 album by Seefeel
 Quique (footballer, born 1945), Spanish football defender
 David Bernier (born 1977), Puerto Rican politician nicknamed "Quique"

See also
 
 
 Enrique (disambiguation)
 Kike (disambiguation)